Cuffing may refer to:
Handcuffing
Peribronchial cuffing